The Hare Indian dog is an extinct domesticated canine; possibly a breed of domestic dog, coydog, or domesticated coyote; formerly found and originally bred in northern Canada by the Hare Indians for coursing.  It had the speed and some characteristics of the coyote, and the domesticated temperament and other characteristics of a domestic dog.  It gradually lost its usefulness as aboriginal hunting methods declined, and became extinct or lost its separate identity through interbreeding with dogs in the 19th century, though some claim the breed still exists in modified form.

Appearance

The Hare Indian dog was a diminutive, slenderly built domesticated canid with a small head and a narrow, pointed and elongated muzzle. Its pointed ears were erect and broad at the base, and closer together than those of the Canadian Eskimo dog. Its legs were slender and rather long. The tail was thick and bushy, and it curled upwards over its right hip, though not to the extent of the Canadian Eskimo dog. The fur was long and straight, the base colour being white with large, irregular greyish black patches intermingled with various brown shades. The outside of the ears was covered with short brown hair which darkened at the base. The fur in the inside of the ears was long and white. The fur of the muzzle was short and white, as with the legs, though it became longer and thicker at the feet. Black patches were present around the eyes. Like the wolves with which it was sympatric, it had long hair between its toes, which projected over the soles, with naked, callous protuberances being present at the root of the toes and soles, even in winter. In size, it was intermediate to the coyote and the American red fox.

Temperament
The Hare Indian dog was apparently very playful, and readily befriended strangers, though it was not very docile, and disliked confinement of any kind.  It apparently expressed affection by rubbing its back against people, similar to a cat. In its native homeland, it was not known to bark, though puppies born in Europe learned how to imitate the barking of other dogs. When hurt or afraid, it howled like a wolf, and when curious, it made a sound described as a growl building up to a howl.

History

It is thought by one writer that the breed originated from a cross between native Tahltan bear dogs and dogs brought to the North American continent by Viking explorers, as it bears strong similarities to Icelandic breeds in appearance and behavior.  Sir J. Richardson of Edinburgh, on the other hand, who studied the breed in the 1820s, in their original form before being diluted by crossings with other breeds, could detect no decided difference in form between this breed and a coyote, and surmised that it was a domesticated version of the wild animal. He wrote, "The Hare Indian or Mackenzie River Dog bears the same relation to the prairie wolf [coyote] as the Esquimeaux Dog [Malamute] does to the great grey wolf." The breed seemed to be kept exclusively by the Hare Indians and other neighboring tribes, such as the Bear, Mountain, Dogrib, Cree, Slavey and Chippewa tribes living in the northwestern territories of Canada and the United States around the Great Bear Lake, Southwest to Lake Winnipeg and Lake Superior and West to the Mackenzie River. They were valued by the Indians as coursorial hunters, and they subsisted almost entirely on the produce of each hunt. Although not large enough to pose a danger to the moose and reindeer they hunted, their small size and broad feet allowed them to pursue large ungulates in deep snow, keeping them at bay until the hunters arrived. It was too small to be used as a beast of burden. It was the general belief among the Indians that the dog's origin was connected to the Arctic fox. When first examined by European biologists, the Hare Indian dog was found to be almost identical to the coyote in build (save for the former's smaller skull) and fur length. The first Hare Indian dogs to be taken to Europe were a pair presented to the Zoological Society of London, after Sir John Richardson's and John Franklin's Coppermine Expedition of 1819–1822. Though originally spread over most of the northern regions of North America, the breed fell into decline after the introduction of firearms made its hunting abilities unnecessary. It gradually intermingled with other breeds such as the Newfoundland dog, the Canadian Eskimo dog and mongrels.

See also
Canadian Eskimo dog
List of dog breeds
List of extinct dog breeds
Tahltan Bear Dog

References

External links
 Hare Indian Dogs
 The Hare Indian Dog

Dog breeds originating in the United States
Extinct dog breeds of Canada
Extinct animals of the United States
First Nations culture
Dog breeds originating from Indigenous Americans

sv:Hare Indian Dog